Melanchroiopsis is a genus of moths of the family Noctuidae. The genus was erected by Harrison Gray Dyar Jr. in 1918.

Species
 Melanchroiopsis acroleuca Dyar, 1918
 Melanchroiopsis mardava Druce, 1897
 Melanchroiopsis noctilux Walker, 1854

References

Agaristinae